Potassium periodate is an inorganic salt with the molecular formula KIO4. It is composed of a potassium cation and a periodate anion and may also be regarded as the potassium salt of periodic acid. Note that the pronunciation is per-iodate, not period-ate.

Unlike other common periodates, such as sodium periodate and periodic acid, it is only available in the metaperiodate form; the corresponding potassium orthoperiodate (K5IO6) has never been reported.

Preparation
Potassium periodate can be prepared by the oxidation of an aqueous solution of potassium iodate by chlorine and potassium hydroxide.

It can also be generated by the electrochemical oxidation of potassium iodate, however the low solubility of KIO3 makes this approach of limited use.

Chemical properties
Potassium periodate decomposes at 582 °C to form potassium iodate and oxygen.

The low solubility of KIO4 makes it useful for the determination of potassium and cerium. 

It is slightly soluble in water (one of the less soluble of potassium salts, owing to a large anion), giving rise to a solution that is slightly alkaline. On heating (especially with manganese(IV) oxide as catalyst), it decomposes to form potassium iodate, releasing oxygen gas.

KIO4 forms tetragonal crystals of the Scheelite type (space group I41/a).

References

Periodates
Potassium compounds
Oxidizing agents